Mimovelindopsis rufotestacea is a species of beetle in the family Carabidae, the only species in the genus Mimovelindopsis.

References

Lebiinae